He Is My Brother is a 1975 American drama film directed by Edward Dmytryk.

Plot
Two boys become shipwrecked on an island and find themselves locked in a struggle with lepers and colonists.

Cast
 Bobby Sherman as Jeff Remington
 Kathy Paulo as Luana
 Keenan Wynn as Brother Dalton
 Robbie Rist as Randy Remington
 Joaquín Martínez as The Kahuna
 Benson Fong as Kiko

See also
 List of American films of 1975

References

External links
 

1975 films
1975 drama films
American drama films
Atlantic Entertainment Group films
Films directed by Edward Dmytryk
Films scored by Ed Bogas
1970s English-language films
1970s American films